Jackson Valoy Perea (born 12 July 1989) is a Colombian footballer. He currently plays as defender for C.D.S. Vida in the Liga Nacional de Fútbol Profesional de Honduras.

References

1989 births
Living people
People from Quibdó
Colombian footballers
Association football defenders
Categoría Primera B players
Liga Nacional de Fútbol Profesional de Honduras players
América de Cali footballers
Sporting San Miguelito players
C.D. Olimpia players
C.D.S. Vida players
Colombian expatriate footballers
Expatriate footballers in Panama
Expatriate footballers in Honduras
Sportspeople from Chocó Department